Vineet Verma (born 25 November 1982 in Aurangabad, State of Maharashtra, India) is an Indian film director, screenwriter, producer, editor, 2D and 3D animator, and storyboard artist.

Biography
Verma comes from a family of artists. His grandfather Bhagwan Das Varma was a writer and his mother Vijaya Verma a classical singer. His father N.K. Verma owns a printing business in New Delhi.

Verma began working in animation right after graduating from high school. Over a period of 10 years, he worked as an animator at Escotoonz Entertainment, Telemission Production, UTV Software Communications, and Crest Animation Studios, while earning a bachelor's degree in Information Technology from the Indira Gandhi National Open University in India. He also earned a Higher National Diploma in computing from Edexcel, London. He began his career as a 2D (Classical and Flash) animator and gradually moved to 3D (Maya and Max) animation and later to live action filmmaking. He was one of the senior animators of the series WordWorld, which is broadcast on PBS Kids and won a 2009 Daytime Emmy for Outstanding Children's Animated Program. In 2008, Verma moved to New York City, where he completed a 1-year intensive filmmaking program at New York Film Academy. He has since written, produced and directed a number of short films. His film Colors, an official selection of the Big Apple Film Festival 2010, was screened at Tribeca Cinemas. Verma was a judge at the 15th annual Derek Freese High School Film and Video Festival 2010 for the Best Animation/Experimental Film category.

Filmography

References

External links

 http://vcreative.synthasite.com/
 http://freesefilmfestival.org/judge-bios-vineet-verma/
 http://www.telemission.in/aboutus.php

Living people
1982 births
People from Aurangabad, Maharashtra
Indian filmmakers
People from Marathwada